The 1905 Navy Midshipmen football team represented the United States Naval Academy during the 1905 college football season. In their second season under head coach Paul Dashiell, the Midshipmen compiled a record of 10–1–1, shut out eight opponents, and outscored all opponents by a combined score of 243 to 23.

Schedule

References

Navy
Navy Midshipmen football seasons
Navy Midshipmen football